This is a list of wars that began between 1990 and 2002. Other wars can be found in the historical lists of wars and the list of wars extended by diplomatic irregularity. Major wars from this era include the Second Congo War in Africa, the Yugoslav Wars in Europe, the Tajikistani Civil War in Asia, and the Cenepa War in South America.

1990–2002

See also
 List of wars: 2003–present

Notes

References

1990-2002
1990s in military history
2000s in military history
1990-2002